Governors in the various provinces of the Viceroyalty of New Spain.

In addition to governors, the following list (under construction) intends to give an overview of colonial units of the provincial level; therefore it also includes some offices of similar rank, especially the intendant. Intendente is both a Spanish and Portuguese word, derived from the French Intendant. It was introduced to the Spanish Empire by the Bourbon Dynasty, which Spain shared with France after the early 18th century. This list also does not distinguish between Gobernaciones and Provincias, because they were essentially two grades of provinces.

Provinces under the Real Audiencia of Santo Domingo
 Under the judicial jurisdiction of the Real Audiencia of Santo Domingo and the administrative supervision of its President-Captain General with great autonomy from the Viceroy of New Spain.

Island of Santo Domingo
 1492–1499 Christopher Columbus, as Governor or Viceroy of the Indies.
 1499–1502 Francisco de Bobadilla, as Governor of the Indies.
 1502–1509 Nicolás de Ovando y Cáceres, as Governor of the Indies.
 1509–1518 Diego Colón, as Governor of the Indies until 1511, thereafter as Viceroy of the Indies.
 1526 Real Audiencia of Santo Domingo established.
 1536 Viceroyalty of the Indies purchased by Crown from Luis Colón. Santo Domingo directly administered by the President-Captain General of the Audiencia of Santo Domingo.
 1795–1808 Spanish part of the Island ceded to France in the Peace of Basel. Island ceases to be a Spanish possession.
 1808–1821 After local revolts and subsequent defeat of the French, Santo Domingo realigns itself with Spain. Yet, this is the era of "Foolish Spain" and the colony is loosely held.
 1821–1844 Haitian occupation of Santo Domingo by Jean-Pierre Boyer
 1844–1861 Birth of the Dominican Republic as an independent country, yet due to fears of re invasion by the Haitian Armies, Dominican Republic realigns itself with Spain.
 1861–1865 Territory is re-Colonized by Spain and Pedro Santana is appointed Governor and Captain General of the Colony of Dominican Republic.
 1865 Dominican Republic is restored as a sovereign nation.

Island of Cuba
 See List of colonial heads of Cuba.
 1510 Conquered by Diego Velázquez de Cuéllar, who becomes first Governor.
 1511 Settlers create Municipality of Barbacoa to separate Island from the Viceroyalty of Diego Colón.
 1607 Governor given additional office of Captain General. Pedro Váldez first Governor-Captain General.
 1765 Independent Intendancy created for the Island. First Intendant was Miguel de Altarriba.
 1795 Audiencia of Santo Domingo moves to Cuba; becomes Audiencia of Puerto Príncipe.
 1821 Collapse of the Viceroyalty of New Spain makes Island of Cuba principal possession of the Spanish Monarchy in America.

Island of Puerto Rico
 See List of governors of Puerto Rico.
 Under the jurisdiction of the Audiencia of Santo Domingo.
 1508 First settlement established by Juan Ponce de León, who becomes first Governor.
 1511 Island returned to the Viceroyalty of Diego Colón.
 1536 Crown purchases Viceroyalty from Luis Colón, Diego's son.
 1536–1545 Each half of the Island administered by the Alcaldes of San Juan and San Germán.
 1545 Governorship reestablished.
 1580 Governor given additional office of Captain General.
 1784 Governor-Captain General given additional office of Intendant.
 1821 Collapse of Viceroyalty of New Spain. Island of Puerto Rico under the jurisdiction of the Audiencia of Puerto Príncipe, Cuba.

Province of Florida (1699–1763)
 See List of colonial governors of Florida.
Intendancy issues handled by the Cuban Intendancy starting in 1763.
 1565 Granted right to communicate directly to the Council of the Indies. Florida overseen by President of the Audiencia of Santo Domingo until subordinated to Cuba in 1763.
 10 February 1763 Traded to Britain (exchanged for Cuba); division into two colonies, East Florida and West Florida.
 9 May 1781 West Florida retaken by Spain.
 23 September 1783 East and West Florida formally returned to Spain (subordinated to Cuba).
 27 October 1785 Northern boundary of Florida established by the Treaty of San Lorenzo/Pinckney's Treaty.
 22 February 1819 Ceded to U.S. by Adams-Onís Treaty.

Province of Nueva Andalucía
  Under the jurisdiction of the Audiencia of Santo Domingo until the creation of the Viceroyalty of New Granada in 1739.
 1536 Province of New Andalusia created.
 1568 New Andalusia joined with neighboring Province of Paria; first Governor Diego Hernández de Serpa.
 1739 Under the jurisdiction of the Audiencia of Bogotá in judicial matters.
 1739–1777 Maintained under the administration of the President of the Audiencia of Santo Domingo.
 1777 Under the jurisdiction of the Audiencia of Santo Domingo in judicial matters; under the Captain General of Venezuela in administrative matters.
 1786 Under the jurisdiction of the Audiencia of Caracas in judicial matters.

Louisiana (1762-1802)
 See List of colonial governors of Louisiana
 23 November 1762 Ceded by France by Treaty of Fontainebleau
 21 March 1801 Retroceded to France by Treaty of Aranjuez.

Provinces of New Spain

Province of Vera Cruz
 Under the jurisdiction of the Audiencia of Mexico.
 1787 Intendencia of Vera Cruz, part of New Spain.
 1821 Part of independent Mexico.
 1824 Transformed into State of Veracruz.

Intendants of Vera Cruz

 1787–1790 Pedro de Corbalán
 1790–1794 Pedro Fernández de Gorositza y Lorea
 1794–1796 Pedro Ponce
 1796–1799 Diego García Panes
 1799–1810 García Dávila
 1810–1812 Carlos de Urrutia y Montoya
 1812–1814 Pedro Telmo Landero
 1814–1815 José de Quevedo
 1816–1818 José Dávila (First time)
 1818–1819 Pascual Sebastián de Liñán y Dolz de Espejo
 1819–1821 José Dávila (Second time)

Kingdom of Mexico or New Spain
Administered directly by the Viceroy and the Real Audiencia of Mexico; see List of viceroys of New Spain.
See Spanish conquest of the Aztec Empire for early history.

Province of Puebla
 Under the jurisdiction of the Audiencia of Mexico.
 1787 Intendencia of Puebla established.
 1821 Part of independent Mexico.
 1824 Puebla transformed into the State of Puebla.
 1846 as a State 49 of the United States
 1898 as a State 18 of the Mexico

Intendants of Puebla
 1787–1811 Manuel Flón y Tejada, conde de la Cadena
 1811–1812 García Dávila
 1812 Santiago de Irissari
 1812–1813 Prudencio de Guadalfajara y Aguilera, conde de Castro Terreño
 1814 Ramón Díaz Ortega
 1814–1815 José Moreno y Daioz
 1815–1816 Joaquín Estévez
 1816–1821 Ciriaco del Llano

Province of Oaxaca
 Under the jurisdiction of the Audiencia of Mexico.
 1521 Marquisate of the Valley of Oaxaca created for Hernán Cortés.
 1787 Intendencia of Oaxaca, part of New Spain.
 1821 Part of independent Mexico.

Intendants Oaxaca
 1787–1808 Antonio de Mora y Peysal
 1808–1810 Antonio María Izquierdo de la Torre
 1810–1814 Joseph María Lazo y Nacarino
 1814–1816 Francisco Rendón (First time)
 1816–1818 Antonio Basilio Gutiérrez de Ulloa
 1818–1821 Francisco Rendón (Second time)

Province of Valladolid
 Under the jurisdiction of the Audiencia of Mexico.
 1787 Intendencia of Valladolid created.
 1821 Part of independent Mexico.
 1824 Valladolid transformed into State of Michoacán.

Intendants of Valladolid
 1787–1791 Juan Antonio de Riaño y Bárcena de los Cuentos y Velarde
 1797–1808 Felipe Díaz de Ortega Bustillo
 1810–1821 Manuel Merino y Moreno

Province of Guanajuato
 Under the jurisdiction of the Audiencia of Mexico.
 1787 Intendecia of Guanajuato created.
 1821 Part of independent Mexico.

Intendants of Guanajuato
 1787–1790 Andrés de Amat y Torosa
 1790–1792 Pedro José Soriano
 1792–1810 Juan Antonio Riaño y Barcena de los Cuentos y Velarde
 1810–1821 Fernando Pérez Marañón

Province of San Luis Potosí
 Under the jurisdiction of the Audiencia of Mexico.
 1787 Intendencia of San Luis Potosí created.
 1821 Part of independent Mexico.

Intendants of San Luis Potosí
 1787–1799 Bruno Díaz de Alcedo
 1799–1800 Vicente Bernabeu
 1800–1804 Onésimo Antonio Durán
 1804–1805 Manuel Ampudía
 1805–1809 José Ignacio Vélez
 1809–1810 José Ruíz de Aguirre
 1810–1821 Manuel Jacinto de Acevedo

Province of Yucatán (Mérida)
 1517 Claimed for Spain.
 1519 Spanish colonization of the Yucatán peninsula begins.
 1527–1543 Province of Yucatán, subordinated to Nueva España (see Mexico).
 1543–1549 Subordinated to the Kingdom of Guatemala (autonomous part of the Viceroyalty).
 1543–1560 Part of Captaincy of Gracias (Yucatán, Chiapas, Tabasco, Panama and Central America).
 1549–1550 Subordinated to Nueva España.
 1550–1560 Subordinated to Guatemala.
 1560 Subordinated to Nueva España.
 1617 Captaincy General of Yucatán established.
 1787 Intendencia of Mérida created.
 28 September 1821 Part of independent Mexico.
 1824 Yucatán transformed into a state.

Governors Yucatán
 1526–1540 Francisco de Montejo (First time)
 1540–1546 Francisco de Montejo, El Mozo (the younger)
 1546–1549 Francisco de Montejo (Second time)
 1549–1565 The Alcaldes of Mérida
 1565–1571 Luis de Céspedes y Oviedo
 1571–1573 Diego de Santillán
 1573–1577 Francisco de Solís
 1577–1582 Guillén de las Casas
 1582–1586 Francisco de Solís
 1586–1593 Antonio de Vozmediano
 1593–1595 Alonso Ordóñez de Nevares
 1595–1596 Pablo Higueras de la Cerda
 1596–1597 Carlos Sámano y Quiñónes
 1597–1604 Diego Fernández de Velasco y Enríquez de Almansa
 1604–1612 Carlos de Luna y Arellano
 1612–1617 Antonio de Figueroa y Bravo
 1617–1619 Francisco Ramírez Briceño
 1619–1620 The Alcaldes of Mérida
 1620–1621 Arias de Losada y Taboada
 1621–1628 Diego de Cardenas y Balda
 1628–1630 Juan de Vargas Machuca
 1631–1633 Fernando Centeño Maldonaldo (First time)
 1633–1635 Jerónimo de Quero y Jiménez
 1635–1636 Fernando Centeño Maldonaldo (Second time)
 1636–1643 Diego Zapata de Cárdenas, marqués de Santo Floro
 1643–1644 Francisco Núñez Melián
 1644–1645 Enrique de Ávila Pacheco (First time)
 1645–1648 Esteban de Azcárraga y Veytias
 1648–1650 Enrique de Ávila Pacheco (Second time)
 1650–1652 García Valdés de Osorio Dóriga y Tiñeo, marqués de Peñalba
 1652–1653 Martín Roble y Villfañe
 1653–1655 Pedro Saenz Izquierdo
 1655–1660 Francisco de Bazán
 1660–1662 José Campero y Campos
 1663–1664 Juan Francisco Esquivel y de la Rosa (First time)
 1664 Rodrigo de Flores y Aldana (First time)
 1664–1667 Juan Francisco Esquivel y de la Rosa (Second time)
 1667–1669 Rodrigo de Flores y Aldana (Second time)
 1669–1670 Frutos Delgado
 1670–1672 Fernando Francisco de Escobedo
 1672–1674 Miguel Cordornio de Sola
 1674–1677 Sancho Fernández de Angulo y Sandoval
 1677–1683 Antonio de Layseca y Alvarado de la Ronda
 1683–1688 Juan Bruno Téllez de Guzmán
 1688–1693 Juan José de la Bárcena
 1693–1699 Roque Soberanis y Centeño
 1699–1703 Martín de Urzúa y Arizmendi, count of Lizárraga (first term)
 1703–1706 Álvaro de Rivaguda Enciso y Luyando
 1706–1708 Martín de Urzúa y Arizmendi, count of Lizárraga (second term)
 1708–1712 Fernando de Meneses y Bravo de Saravia
 1712–1715 Alonso de Meneses y Bravo de Saravia
 1715–1720 Juan Jose de Vertiz y Ontanón
 1720–1724 Antonio Cortaire y Terreros
 1724–1733 Antonio de Figueroa y Silva Lasso de la Vega Ladrón del Niño de Guevara
 1733–1734 Juan Fernández de Sabariego
 1734–1736 Santiago de Aguirre Negro y Estrada Martínez de Maturana y Estrada
 1736–1743 Manuel Ignacio Salcedo y Sierra Alta y Rado y Bedia
 1743–1750 Anontio de Benevides
 1750–1752 Juan José de Clou, marqués de Iscar
 1752–1758 Melchor de Navarrette
 1758–1761 Alonso Fernández de Heredia
 1761–1762 José Crespo y Honorato
 1762–1763 Antonio Ainz de Ureta
 1763 José Álvarez
 1763–1764 Felipe Ramírez de Estenoz
 1764–1771 Cristóbal de Zayas
 1771–1777 Antonio de Oliver
 1778–1779 Hugo Ocónor Cunco y Fali
 1779–1783 Roberto Rivas Betancourt
 1783–1789 José Marino y Ceballos

Governor-Intendants of Mérida
 1789–1793 Lucas de Gálvez
 1793–1800 Arturo O' Neil y O' Kelly
 1800–1811 Benito Pérez Brito de los Ríos y Fernández Valdelomar
 1812–1815 Manuel Artazo y Torredemer
 1815–1820 Miguel Castro y Araoz
 1820–1821 Mariano Carrillo y Albornoz
 1821 Juan María Echéverri

Kingdom of Nueva Galicia (Guadalajara)
 1531 Nueva Galicia conquered and created by Nuño Beltrán de Guzmán, first President of the Real Audiencia of Mexico.
 1535 Viceroyalty established, Antonio de Mendoza first Viceroy.
 1545 Alcaldia Mayor of Nueva Galicia established.
 1549 Audiencia of Nueva Galicia established; administration given to Audiencia President.
 1787 Intendencia of Guadalajara created; Audiencia Presidency becomes a judicial role.
 1821 Intendancy of Guadalajara part of independent Mexico.
 1824 Guadalajara becomes State of Jalisco.

Province of New Galicia

Governor-Presidents of Guadalajara
 1679–1702 Alonso de Ceballos y Villagutierre
 1702–1703 Antonio Hipólito de Abarca Vidal y Valda
 1703–1708 Juan de Escalante Colombres y Mendoza
 1708–1716 Toribio Rodríguez de Solís
 1716–1724 Tomás Terán de los Ríos
 1724–1727 Nicolás Rivera y Santa Cruz
 1727–1732 Tomás Rivera y Santa Cruz
 1732–1737 José Barragán de Burgos
 1737–1743 Francisco de Aiza, marqués del Castillo de Aiza
 1743–1751 Fermín de Echevers y Subiza
 1751–1760 José de Basarte y Borán
 1760–1761 Francisco Galindo Quiñónes y Barrientos (First time)
 1761–1764 Pedro Montesinos de Lara
 1764–1771 Francisco Galindo Quiñónes y Barrientos (Second time)
 1771–1776 Eusebio Sánchez Pareja y Beleño (First time)
 1776–1777 Ruperto Vicente de Luyando
 1777–1786 Eusebio Sánchez Pareja y Beleño (Second time)

Governor-Intendants of Guadalajara
 1787–1791 Antonio de Villaurrutia y Salcedo
 1791–1798 Jacobo de Ugarte y Loyola
 1800–1804 José Fernando de Abascal y Sousa
 1804–1805 José Ignacio Ortiz de Salinas
 1805–1811 Roque Abarca
 1811–1821 José de la Cruz

Province of Zacatecas
 Under the jurisdiction of the Audiencia of Guadalajara.
 1787 Intendencia of Zacatecas, part of New Spain.
 1821 Part of independent Mexico.
 1824 Province transformed into State of Zacatecas.

Intendants of Zacatecas
 1789–1792 Felipe Cleere
 1792–1796 José de Peón y Valdés
 1796–1810 Francisco Rendón
 1810–1811 Miguel de Rivera, conde de Santiago de la Laguna
 1811 José Manuel de Ochoa
 1811 Juan José Zambrano
 1811–1812 Martín de Mednina
 1812–1814 Santiago de Irisarri
 1814–1816 Diego García Conde
 1816–1820 José de Gayangos
 1821–1823 Manuel Orive y Novales

Province of Nuevo Santander
 Under the jurisdiction of the Audiencia of Guadalajara.
 1746 Spanish settlement begins.
 1748 Province of Nuevo Santander created.
 1777–1793 Part of Provincias Internas.
 1812–1822 Part of Provincias Internas.
 1822 Part of independent Mexico as Tamaulipas.

Governors of Nuevo Santander
 31 May 1748 – 8 April 1767 José de Escandón y Helguera
 8 April 1767 – 20 January 1768 Juan Fernando de Palacio
 20 January 1768 – 18 September 1769 José Rubio
 18 September 1769 – 12 August 1777 Vicente González Santianés
 August 1777 – 19 February 1779 Francisco de Echegaray
 19 February 1779 – 17 April 1779 Vacant
 17 April 1779 – 21 November 1779 Manuel Medina
 21 November 1779 – 17 February 1780 Vacant
 17 February 1780 – 17 March 1781 Manuel Ignacio de Escandón (First time)
 17 March 1781 – 20 February 1786 Diego Lazaga
 20 February 1786 – 23 December 1788 Juan Miguel Zozaya (First time)
 23 December 1788 – 18 June 1789 Melchor Vidal de Lorca
 20 June 1789 – 10 September 1789 Juan Miguel Zozaya (Second time)
 10 September 1789 – 10 July 1790 Manuel Muñoz
 10 July 1790 – 21 May 1800 Manuel Ignacio de Escandón (Second time)
 21 May 1800 – January 1802 José Blanco
 January 1802 – 18 April 1804 Francisco de Ixart
 18 April 1804 – 18 September 1804 Pedro de Alba
 18 September 1804 – 15 April 1811 Manuel de Iturbe y Iraeta
 15 April 1811 – 1 May 1819 Joaquín de Arredondo
 September 1819 – September 1819 Juan Fermín de Janicotena (acting)
 1 May 1819 – 7 July 1821 José María Echeagaray
 7 July 1821 – 22 September 1822 Felipe de la Garza Cisneros

New Kingdom of León (Nuevo León)
 Under the jurisdiction of Audiencia of Guadalajara.
 1582 Nuevo Reino de León established.
 1777–1793 Part of the Provincias Internas.
 1821 Part of independent Mexico.
 1824 Kingdom transformed into State of Nuevo León.

Governors of Nuevo León
 1698–1703 Juan Francisco de Vergara y Mendoza
 1703–1705 Francisco Báez Treviño (First time) (interim)
 1705–1707 Gregorio de Salinas Verona
 1707–1708 Cipriano García de Pruneda
 1708–1710 Luis García de Pruneda (interim)
 1710–1714 Francisco Mier y Torre
 1714–1718 Francisco Báez Treviño (Second time) (interim)
 1718–1719 Juan Ignacio Flores Mogollón
 1719–1723 Francisco de Bardadillo y Vittoria
 1723–1725 Juan José de Arriaga y Brambila
 1725–1730 Pedro de Saravia Cortés
 1730–1731 Bernardino de Meneses Monroy y Mendonza Bracamonte, conde de Peñalba
 1731–1740 José Antonio Fernández de Jáuregui y Urrita
 1740–1746 Pedro del Barrio Junco y Espriella (First time)
 1746–1752 Vicente Bueno de la Borbolla
 1752–1757 Pedro del Barrio Junco y Espriella (Second time)
 1757–1759 Domingo Miguel Guajardo (interim)
 1759–1762 Juan Manuel Muñoz de Villavicencio
 1762–1764 Carlos de Velasco
 1764–1772 Ignacio Ussel y Guimbarda
 1772–1773 Francisco de Echegaray
 1773–1781 Melchor Vidal de Lorca y Villena
 1781–1785 Vicente González de Santianes
 1785–1795 Joaquín de Mier y Noriega
 1795–1805 Simón de Herrera y Leyva
 1805–1810 Pedro de Herrera y Leyva
 1810–1811 Manuel de Santa Maria
 1813 Ramón Díaz Bustamante
 1812–1817 The Alcaldes of Monterrey
 1817–1818 Bernardo Villareal
 1818–1821 Francisco Bruno Barrea

Commandancy General of the Provincias Internas
 All Provincias Internas were under the jurisdiction of the Audiencia of Guadalajara with oversight by the Viceroy before the creation of the Commandancy General.
 1777 Commandancy General of the Provincias Internas created with autonomy from the Viceroy.
 1788–1793 Divided into Eastern Provinces (Coahuila, Texas, Nuevo León, Nuevo Santander) and Western Provinces (Sonora, Nueva Vizcaya, Nuevo México, Las Californias).
 1793 Nuevo León and Nuevo Santander removed from the Provincias Internas.
 1812 Nuevo Santander part of the Provincias Internas.
 1813–1821 Re-divided into Eastern and Western Commandancies General.

Commandants General
 1777–1783 Teodoro Francisco de Croix, conde de Croix
 1783–1784 Felipe de Neve
 1784–1786 José Antonio Rengel de Alcaraz y Páez
 1786–1788 Jacobo Ugarte y Loyola
1792 interim Josef de la Barcena y Manzano
 1793–1802 Pedro de Nava
 1802–1813 Nemesio Salcedo y Salcedo

Eastern Provinces (Oriente)

Commandants General of the Eastern Provinces
 1788–1791 Juan de Uglade
 1791–1793 Ramón de Castro y Gutierrez
 1813 Simón Herrera y Leyva
 1813–1817 Joaquín de Arredondo y Mioño Pelegrin y Bustamante

Province of Coahuila
 Under the jurisdiction of the Audiencia of Guadalajara.
 1575 Part of Nueva Vizcaya.
 23 January 1691 Province of Coahuila and Texas.
 1716 Coahuila a separate province.
 1777–1822 Part of the Provincias Internas.
 1822 Part of independent Mexico.
 1824 Province transformed into State of Coahuila y Texas.

Governors of Coahuila
 1698–1703 Francisco Cuervo y Valdés
 1703–1705 Matías de Aguirre
 1705–1708 Martín de Alarcón
 1708–1714 Simón de Padilla y Córdova
 1714 Pedro Fermín de Echever y Subiza
 1714–1716 Juan de Valdes
 1716–1717 José Antonio de Eca y Múzquiz
 1717–1719 Martín de Alarcón
 1719–1722 José Azlo y Virto de Vera, marqués de San Miguel de Aguayo
 1722–1729 Blas de la Garza Falcón (First time)
 1729–1733 Manuel de Sandoval
 1733–1735 Blas de la Garza Falcón (Second time)
 1735–1739 Clemente de la Garza Falcón
 1739–1744 Juan García Pruneda
 1744–1754 Pedro de Rábago y Terán
 1754–1756 Manuel Antonio Bustillos y Ceballos
 1756–1757 Miguel de Sesman y Escudero
 1757–1759 Ángel Martos y Navarrette
 1759–1762 Jacinto de Barríos y Jáguregui (First time)
 1762–1764 Lorenzo Cancio Sierra y Cienfuegos
 1764–1765 Diego Ortiz Parrilla
 1765–1768 Jacinto de Barríos y Jáguregui (Second time)
 1768–1769 José Costilla y Terán
 1769–1777 Jacobo de Ugarte y Loyola
 1777–1783 Juan de Ugalde
 1783–1788 Pedro Fueros
 1788–1790 Juan Gutiérrez de la Cueva (First time)
 1790–1795 Miguel Jose de Emparán
 1795–1797 Juan Gutiérrez de la Cueva (Second time)
 1797–1805 Antonio Cordero y Bustamante (First time)
 1805–1809 José Joaquín de Ugarte
 1809–1817 Antonio Cordero y Bustamante (Second time)
 1817–1818 Antonio García de Tejada
 1818–1819 José Franco
 1819–1820 Manuel Pardo
 1820–1822 Antonio Elosúa

Province of Texas (1698–1822)
 1682 Ruled as part of Coahuila; under the jurisdiction of the Audiencia of Guadalajara.
 February 1685 – January 1689 French establish Fort Saint Louis at Matagorda Bay.
 1691 Province of Coahuila y Texas created.
 c.1726 Coahuila and Texas separated.
 1822 Province of Mexico.
 14 October 1824 Transformed into State of Coahuila y Texas.
 15 November 1835 Texas ruled by Provisional Government.
 2 March 1836 Independent Republic of Texas established.

Province of Nuevo México (1598–1822)
 1595 Santa Fe de Nuevo México conquered and established.
 1822 Part of independent Mexico.
 14 October 1824 Territory of Santa Fe de Nuevo México created.

Western Provinces (Poniente)

Commandants General of the Western Provinces
 1788–1790 Jacobo Ugarte y Loyola
 1790–1793 Pedro de Nava
 1813–1817 Bernardo Bonavia y Zapata
 1817–1821 Alejo García Conde

Province of Sonora y Sinaloa
 Under the jurisdiction of the Audiencia of Guadalajara
 1732 Province of Sonora y Sinaloa (formerly part of Nueva Vizcaya) created.
 1777–1821 Part of the Provincias Internas.
 1787 Intendencia of Sonora created.
 1821 Part of independent Mexico.
 1824 Sonora y Sinaloa transformed into a State.

Governors of Sonora y Sinaloa
 1734–1741 Manuel Bernal de Huidobro
 1741–1748 Augustín de Vildósola
 1748–1749 José Rafael Rodriguez Gallardo
 1749–1753 Diego Ortiz Parilla
 1753–1755 Pablo de Arce y Arroyo
 1755–1760 Juan Antonio de Mendoza
 1760–1762 José Tiendra de Cuervo
 1763–1770 Juan Claudio de Pineda
 1770–1772 Pedro de Corbalán (First time)
 1772–1773 Mateo Sastré
 1773–1777 Francisco Antonio Crespo
 1777–1787 Pedro de Corbalán (Second time)

Governor-Intendants of Sonora
 1787–1789 Pedro Garrido y Durán
 1789–1790 Augustín de la Cuenta y Zayas
 1790–1793 Enrique Gimarest
 1793–1796 Alonso Tresierra y Cano
 1796–1813 Alejo García Conde
 1813–1817 Manuel Antonio Cordero y Bustamante (First time)
 1818 Ignacio de Bustamante (First time)
 1818 Manuel Fernández Rojo
 1818–1819 Igancio de Bustamante (Second time)
 1819 Juan José Lombrán
 1819–1821 Manuel Antonio Cordero y Bustamante (Second time)

Province of Nueva Vizcaya
 Under the jurisdiction of the Audiencia of Guadalajara.
 1562 Province of Nueva Vizcaya established.
 1777–1821 Part of the Commandancy General of the Provincias Internas.
 1786 Intendencia of Durango established.
 1821 Province part of independent Mexico
 1824 Nueva Vizcaya transformed into the states of Durango and Chihuahua.

Governors of Nueva Vizcaya
 1562–1575 Francisco de Ibarra
 1575–1576 Miguel Lopez de Ibarra
 1576–1589 Diego de Ibarray Perez de Marqueagui
 1589–1603 Rodrigo Rio de Losa y Rodriguez Gordujuela
 1603–1612 Francisco de Urdiňola
 1612–1624 Gaspar de Alvear
 1624-1629 Mateo de Vega
 1629–1631 Hipolito de Velasco
 1631–1633 Luis de Velasco
 1633–1638 Luis Monsalve y Saavedra
 1638–1640 Francisco Bravo de la Serna
 1640–1640 Luis de Valdes y Rejano
 1640–1642 Fernando Suoza de Suarea
 1642–1648 Luis de Valdes
 1648–1654 Diego Guajardo Fajardo
 1654–1660 Enrique Davila y Pacheco
 1660–1666 Francisco Gorraez y Beaumont
 1666–1671 Antonio Oca y Sarmiento
 1671–1676 Jose Garcia Salcedo
 1676–1676 Martin Rebollar y Cuevas
 1676–1680 Lope de Sierra y Osorio
 1680–1683 Bartolome Estrada de Valdez y Ramirez Jove
 1683-1687 Jose de Neira y Quiroga  
 1688–1693 Juan Isidro de Pardiňas Villar de Francos
 1693–1698 Gabriel del Castillo
 1698–1703 Juan Bautista de Larrea Palomino y Solís
 1703–1708 Juan Fernández de Córdoba
 1708–1714 Antonio de Deza y Ulloa
 1714–1720 Juan Manuel de San Juan y Santa Cruz
 1720–1723 Martín de Alday
 1723–1727 José Sebastián López de Carvajal
 1728–1733 Ignacio Francisco de Barrutia y Aeta Esenagucia
 1733–1738 Juan José Vértiz y Ontañón
 1738–1743 Juan Bautista de Belaunzarán y Zumeta
 1743–1748 José Enrique de Cosío, marqués de Torre Campo
 1748–1753 Jaun Francico de la Puerta y de la Barrera
 1753–1761 Mateo Antonio de Mendoza Díaz de Arce
 1761–1769 José Carlos de Agüero y González de Agüero
 1769–1776 José de Fayni y Gálvez
 1776–1784 Felipe de Barri
 1784–1785 Juan Velázquez
 1785–1785 Manuel Muñoz
 1785–1786 Manuel Flon y Tejada, conde de la Cadena

Governor-Intendants of Reino de la Nueva Vizcaya (Durango)
 1786–1791 Felipe Díaz de Ortega Bustillo
 1791–1793 Francisco Antonio de Potau y de Colón de Portugal
 1793–1796 Francisco José de Urrutia Montoya
 1796–1813 Bernardo Bonavia y Zapata
 1813–1817 Alejo Garcia Conde
 1817–1818 Angel Pinilla y Pérez
 1818–1819 Antonio Cordero y Bustamante
 1819–1821 Diego García Conde

Province of Las Californias
 28 September 1542 – First European landing by Juan Rodríguez Cabrillo.
 4 November 1595 – Sebastián Rodríguez Cermeño claims the coast for Spain.
 1697 – First Mission erected in Baja California.
 1768 – Spanish settlement begins.
 1769 – First Mission and Presidio erected in 'upper' California.
 3 June 1770 – Province of Las Californias established.
 1804 – Provinces of Alta California and Baja California created.
 11 April 1822 – Both provinces part of independent Mexican Empire as the Territories of Baja and Alta California.

Governors of Las Californias
 1768 – 9 July 1770 Gaspar de Portolá (1723–1786)
 March 1770 – 4 March 1775 Felipe de Barri (?-1784 – civil Governor in Loreto)
 9 July 1770 – 23 March 1774 Pedro Fages (1730–1796?) 
 23 March 1774 – 3 February 1777 Fernando José Rivera y Moncada (1724–1781)
 3 February 1777 – 7 September 1782 Felipe de Neve (1728–1784)
 7 September 1782 – 17 April 1791 Pedro Fages (s.a.)
 17 April 1791 – 9 April 1792 José Antonio de Roméu, conde de Rivera Gigado (1842–1792)
 9 April 1792 – November 1794 José Joaquín de Arrillaga (First time) (1750–1814) (acting)
 November 1794 – 16 January 1800 Diego de Borica (1742–1800)
 16 January 1800 – 11 March 1802 Pedro de Alberni (acting) (1747–1802)
 11 March 1802 – 1804 José Joaquín de Arrillaga (Second time) (s.a.)
See List of pre-statehood governors of California for Governors of Alta California (Spanish: 1804–1822, Mexican: 1822–1847)

Provinces of the Kingdom of Guatemala
 Under the judicial jurisdiction of the Real Audiencia of Guatemala and the administrative supervision of its President-Captain General with great autonomy from the Viceroy of New Spain.

Province of Guatemala
 Directly administered by the President-Captain General of the Real Audiencia of Guatemala.

Province of Chiapas
 1529 Province of Chiapas established.
 1576 Alcaldía Mayor of Ciudad Real de Chiapa
 1769 Divided into Alcaldía Mayor of Ciudad Real and Alcaldía Mayor of Tuxtla
 20 September 1786 Intendencia of Ciudad Real de Chiapas created.
 1821 Part of independent Mexico.
 1824 Province transformed into State of Chiapas, with the exception of Soconusco.

Lieutenant Governors of Chiapas
 1528–1529 Diego de Mazariegos
 1529–1531 Juan Enríquez de Guzmán
 1531 Diego de Olguín
 1532–1535 Francisco Ortés de Velasco (First time)
 1535–1537 García de Padilla
 1537–1540 Baltazar Guerra de la Vega
 1540 Gonzalo de Ovalle (First time)
 1540 García de Mendano (First time)
 1540–1542 Francisco de Montejo
 1542–1544 García de Mendano (Second time)
 1544 Antonio de Saz y de la Torre
 1545 Luis de Torres Medinilla
 1545 Francisco Ortés de Velasco (Second time)
 1545 Gonzalo de Ovalle (Second time)
 1545–1553 The Alcaldes of Ciudad Real de Chiapa
 1553–1556 Antonio Alfonso Mazariegos
 1556–1570 Francisco Ortés de Velasco (Third time)
 1570 Francisco del Valle Marroquín
 1570–1576 Juan de Meza

Alcaldes Mayores of Ciudad Real de Chiapa
 1577–1581 Juan de Meza
 1582–1586 Gaspar de Padilla
 1586–1593 Pedro Martínez (First time)
 1593 Martín Núñez
 1594–1595 Pedro Martínez (Second time)
 1596–1598 Alonso Bernaldez de Quiroz
 1599 Baltazar Muriel de Valdivieso (First time)
 1600 Bernardo Quiroz y Aguilera
 1601–1610 Baltazar Muriel de Valdivieso (Second time)
 1610–1616 Gabriel de Loarte y Ovalle
 1617 Pedro Urbina de Cervera
 1617–1620 Agustín García de Albornoz Legaspi
 1620 Gabriel de Orellana
 1621–1627 Gabriel de Ugarte y Ayala
 1627 Baltazar Caso
 1628–1633 Juan Ruiz de Contreras (First time)
 1633 José Sánchez Serrano
 1634 Juan Ruiz de Contreras (Second time)
 1634–1638 Francisco de Ávila y Lugo (First time)
 1638 Diego Carrillo
 1639 Francisco de Ávila y Lugo (Second time)
 1639–1646 Diego de Vera Ordóñez de Villa Quirán
 1646–1650 Melchor Sardo de Céspedes
 1650 Pedro Lara de Mongrovejo (First time)
 1650–1656 Alonso Vargas Zapata y Luján
 1656–1660 Baltazar Caso Ponce de León (First time)
 1660 Pedro López Ramales
 1661 Baltazar Caso Ponce de León (Second time)
 1662–1666 Fernando Álvarez de Aguiar
 1666 Pedro de Zavaleta
 1667 Pedro Lara de Mongrovejo (Second time)
 1667–1670 Agustín Sáenz Vázquez
 1670 Andrés de Ochoa Zárate
 1671–1682 Juan Bautista González del Álamo
 1682 José de Oruéta
 1683–1685 Martínez de Urdaniz
 1685–1693 Manuel de Mayesterra y Atocha
 1693–1695 Francisco Vadillo (First time)
 1695 Melchor de Mencos
 1696–1697 Francisco Vadillo (Second time)
 1698 Francisco Astudillo Sardo
 1698–1708 Martín González de Vergara y Pardo
 1708 Gaspar de Sierra
 1709 Manuel de Bustamante (First time)
 1709 Francisco Ballesteros
 1710–1712 Pedro Gutiérrez de Mier y Terán
 1712 Fernando del Monge (First time)
 1712–1714 Melchor Sardo de Céspedes
 1714–1719 Manuel de Bustamante (Second time)
 1720 Carlos Vélez y Arriaga
 1720 José Damián Fernández de Córdoba
 1721–1724 José Damián Cruz de Córdob
 1725–1728 Martín José de Bustamante
 1728–1730 Antonio Varela y Moreno
 1730 Gabriel Francisco Laguna
 1731 Fernando del Monge (Second time)
 1732–1737 Pedro José Caballero
 1734 Antonio de la Unquera y Cevallos
 1735–1736 Gabriel Francisco Laguna
 1737 Miguel Fernández Romero
 1737 Baltazar González de Vega
 1738–1743 Antonio Zuazua y Mújica
 1744–1746 Juan Bautista Garracín
 1746–1751 Francisco Ángel de Elías
 1752 Juan José Bocanegra
 1753–1754 José Ángel Toledo
 1755–1758 Manuel Ortiz
 1758 Miguel Ignacio Viurrum
 1759–1760 Antonio de Obeso
 1761–1765 Joaquín Fernández Prieto Isla y Bustamante
 1765–1767 Tomás de Murga
 1767–1768 Fernando Gómez de Andrade

Alcaldes Mayores of Ciudad Real
 1770–1772 Esteban Gutiérrez de la Torre
 1772–1785 Cristóbal Ortiz de Avilés
 1785 Ignacio Coronado
 1786 Antonio Gutiérrez de Arce
 1786 Alonso de Vargas

Alcaldes Mayores of Tuxtla
 1769–1777 Juan de Oliver
 1778–1783 Luis de Engrava y Ovalle
 1783–1786 Miguel del Pino y Martínez

Governor-Intendants of Chiapas
 1786–1789 Francisco Saavedra Carbajal
 1789–1794 Agustín de las Cuentas y Zayas
 1794 Francisco Durán
 1794 Luis Martínez
 1795 Tomás Mollinedo
 1796–1802 Antonio Norberto Serrano Polo
 1802–1807 Manuel de Olazábal
 1807 Mariano Valero
 1807–1809 Tomás de Mollinedo y Villavicencio
 1809 Manuel Junquito y Baquerizo (First time)
 1810 Manuel Ramírez
 1811–1814 Manuel Junquito y Baquerizo (Second time)
 1814 Juan Nepomuceno Batres
 1814 Antonio Gutiérrez de Arce
 1815 Gregorio Suasnávar
 1816 Juan Antonio López
 1817–1818 Juan María de Ancheita
 1819 Carlos Castañón
 1819–1821 Juan Nepomuceno Batres

Province of Nicaragua
 1502 Coast of Nicaragua discovered by Christopher Columbus.
 1522 First settlements established.
 1522–1538 Subordinated to Audiencia of Santo Domingo; ruled by governors.
 1524 León founded.
 1538–1544 Subordinated to the Real Audiencia of Panama.
 1544 Part of the Kingdom of Guatemala.
 1552 Governorship demoted to Alcaldía Mayor.
 1566 Governorship reestablished.
 1661 – 12 September 1861 British Protectorate over the tribal Mosquito Coast.
 21 August 1685 – 14 September 1685 León captured by pirates under William Dampier.
 23 December 1786 Intendencia of León (including Costa Rica) created.
 15 September 1821 Declaration of independence from Spain of the Kingdom of Guatemala as part of Mexican Independence (Acta de Nublados).
 28 September 1821 León, while awaiting developments with regard to Spain, proclaims its secession from the Kingdom of Guatemala.
 4 October 1821 Granada reaffirms its being part of the Kingdom of Guatemala.
 12 October 1821 Part of First Mexican Empire.
 17 April 1823 León declares itself an "orphan" and thus sovereign.
 1 July 1823 The Federal Republic of Central America proclaims independence from Mexico and invites those provinces that had left the Kingdom of Guatemala to join.
 2 July 1823 León accedes to invitation; incorporation into Central America.
 4 January 1825 León surrenders to the authority of Manuel Arzú, commissioned by the federal government.
 30 April 1838 Separation from the Federation sanctioned; promulgated 2 May 1838.
 28 February 1854 Republic of Nicaragua reestablished.

Governors of Nicaragua
 1522–1524 Gil González Dávila
 1524–1526 Francisco Hernández de Córdoba
 1526–1531 Pedro Arias de Ávila
 1531–1535 Francisco de Castañeda
 1536–1544 Rodrigo de Contreras
 1544 Diego de Herrera
 1544–1552 Administered directly by the Audiencia of Guatemala.

Alcaldes Mayores of Nicaragua
 1552–1553 Alonso Ortiz de Elgueta
 1553 Nicolás López de Urraga (First time)
 1553–1555 Juan de Cavallón
 1555 Juan Márquez
 1555–1556 Álvaro de Paz
 1556–1557 Nicolás López de Urraga (Second time)
 1558 Andrés López Moraga
 1558–1560 Francisco de Mendoza
 1561–1564 Juan Vásquez de Coronado
 1564–1566 Hernando Bermejo

Governors of Nicaragua
 1566–1575 Alonso de Casaos
 1575–1576 Francisco del Valle Marroquín
 1576–1583 Diego de Artieda y Chirino
 1583–1589 Hernando de Gasco
 1589–1592 Carlos de Arellano
 1592–1599 Bartolomé de Lences
 1599–1603 Bernardino de Obando
 1603–1622 Alonso Lara de Córdoba
 1622 Cristóbal de Villagrán
 1622–1623 Alonso Lazo
 1623–1625 Santiago de Figueroa
 1625–1627 Lázaro de Albizúa
 1627–1630 Juan de Agüero
 1630–1634 Francisco de Asagra y Vargas
 1634–1641 Pedro de Velasco
 1641–1660 Juan de Bracamonte
 1660–1665 Diego de Castro
 1665–1669 Juan Salinas y Cerda
 1669–1673 Antonio Temiño Dávila
 1673–1681 Pablo de Loyola
 1681 Antonio Coello
 1681–1689 Pedro Álvarez Castrillón
 1689–1693 Gabriel Rodríguez Bravo de Hoyos
 1693–1699 Pedro Gerónimo Luis de Comenares y Camargo
 1699 – 22 October 1705 Miguel de Camargo
 22 October 1705 – 21 August 1721 Sebastián de Arancibia y Sasi
 1722–1724 Antonio Póveda y Rivadineira (First time) (died 1727)
 1724–1727 Tomás Marcos, duque de Estrada (First time)
 26 January 1727 – 7 July 1727 Antonio Póveda y Rivadineira (Second time) (s.a.)
 26 August 1727 – 1728 Pedro Martínez de Uparrio
 August 1728 – 1730 Tomás Marcos, duque de Estrada (Second time)
 1730–1736 Bartolomé González Fitoria
 1736–1740 Antonio Ortiz
 21 November 1740 – 1745 José Antonio Lacayo de Briones
 1745 Francisco Antonio de Cáceres Molinedo
 23 August 1745 – December 1746 Juan de Vera
 December 1746 – 1753 Alonso Fernández de Heredia
 1753–1756 José González Rancaño
 1756–1759 Melchor Vidal de Lorca y Villena (First time)
 1759–1765 Pantaleón Ibáñez Cuevas
 1765–1766 Melchor Vidal de Lorca y Villena (Second time)
 1766–1776 Domingo Cabello y Robles
 1777–1782 Manuel de Quiroga
 1779–1783 José de Estachería
 1783 – 23 December 1786 Juan de Ayza y Blancazo Allue y Palacín

Governors-Intendants of León (Nicaragua)
 23 December 1786 – 1789 Juan de Ayza y Blancazo Allue y Palacín
 1789–1793 José Mateu y Aranda
 1793 – 13 December 1811 José de Salvador
 13 December 1811 – 1814 Nicolás García Jerez (14 December 1814 – 1817 also President of the Governing Junta)
 1814–1816 Juan Bautista Gual
 1816–1818 Manuel de Beltranena
 1818–April 1823 Miguel González Saravia

Superior Political Chief and Intendant of León
Office of Superior Political Chief (Jefe Político Superior) created by Spanish Constitution of 1812.
 15 September 1821 – 12 October 1821 Miguel González de Saravia y Colarte, President of the Provisional Governing Junta
 17 April 1823 – 4 January 1825 Provisional Governing Junta, members:
 Pedro Solís Terán (Primer Vocal)
 José del Carmen Salazar Lacayo
 Francisco Quiñónez
 Domingo Nicolás Galarza y Briceño de Coca
 Basilio Carrillo
 José Valentín Fernández Gallegos (alternate)
 Juan Modesto Hernández (alternate)

Province of Costa Rica
 1502 Claimed for Spain.
 1540 Province of Nuevo Cartago y Costa Rica created, part of the Kingdom of Guatemala.
 1565 Province of Costa Rica created.
 23 December 1786 Gobierno ('government') of Costa Rica established within Intendencia of León (see Nicaragua).
 12 November 1821 Independence (Province of Costa Rica)
 4 March 1824 – 15 November 1838 Constituent state of the Federal Republic of Central America.
 8 September 1824 Free State of Costa Rica.
 7 March 1847 State of Costa Rica.
 31 August 1848 Republic of Costa Rica.

Governors of Costa Rica
 1568–1573 Parafán de Ribera
 1574–1577 Alonso de Anguciana y Gamboa
 1577–1590 Diego de Artieda y Chirino
 1590–1591 Juan Valásquez Ramiro
 1591–1592 Bartolomé de Lences
 1592–1595 Gonzalo de lam Palma
 1595–1599 Fernando de la Cueva
 1600–1604 Gonzalo Vázquez de Coronado y Arias de Ávila
 1604–1613 Juan de Ocón y Trillo
 1613–1619 Juan de Mendoza y Medrano
 1619–1624 Alonso del Castillo y Guzmán
 1624–1630 Juan de Echáuz
 1630–1634 Juan de Villalta
 1634–1636 Juan de Agüero
 1636–1644 Gregorio de Sandoval y González de Alcalá
 1644–1650 Juan de Cháves y Mendoza
 1650–1655 Juan Fernández de Salinas y de la Cerda
 1655–1661 Andrés Arias Maldonaldo y Mendoza
 1662–1664 Rodrigo Arias Maldonaldo
 1664–1665 Juan de Obregón
 1664–1674 Juan López de la Flor
 1675–1681 Juan Francisco Sáenz Vázquez y Sendín
 1681–1693 Miguel Gómez de Lara
 1693–1698 Manuel de Bustamante y Vivero
 1698–1704 Francisco Serrano de Reina y Lizarde
 1704–1707 Diego de Herrera y Campuzano
 1707–1712 Lorenzo Antonio de Granada y Balbín
 1713–1717 José Antonio Lacayo de Briones y Palacios
 1717–1718 Pedro Ruíz de Bustamante
 1718–1726 Diego de la Haya y Fernández
 1727–1736 Baltasar Francisco de Valderrama y Haro
 1736 Antonio Vázquez de la Quadra
 1736–1739 Francisco Antonio de Carrandi y Menán
 1739–1740 Francisco de Olaechea
 2 June 1740 – 5 November 1747 Juan Gemmir y Lleonart (died 1747)
 22 November 1747 – 14 March 1750 Luis Díez Navarro (interim to 22 January 1748)
 1750–1754 Cristóbal Ignacio de Soría
 1754 – 2 July 1756 Francisco Fernández de la Pástora (died 1756)
 12 August 1756 – 24 October 1757 José Antonio de Oreamuno y Vázquez Melendez (First time) (interim)
 24 October 1757 – 18 September 1758 José Gonzalez Rancaño (interim)
 18 September 1758 – 1761 Manuel Soler (died 1763) (abandoned office 1760)
 1761 Francisco Javier de Oreamuno y Vázquez Melendez (interim)
 1761 Pedro Manuel de Ayerdi (interim)
 1761–1764 José Antonio de Oreamuno y Vázquez Melendez (Second time) (interim)
 1764–1773 José Joaquín de Nava y Cabezudo (acting to 3 April 1764)
 1773–1778 Juan Fernández de Bobadilla (First time) (died 1781)
 25 June 1778 – 23 July 1780 José Perié y Barros (First time) (died 1789)
 23 July 1780 – 28 January 1781 Juan Fernández de Bobadilla (Second time) (interim)
 28 January 1781 – 1781 Francisco Carzo (interim)
 11 April 1781 – 1785 Juan Flores (interim)
 31 January 1785 – 7 January 1789 José Perié y Barros (Second time) (s.a.)
 7 January 1789 – 1789 José Antonio de Oriamuno (acting)
 1789–1790 Juan Esteban Martínez de Pinillos (interim)
 7 November 1790 – 1797 José Vázquez y Téllez
 3 April 1797 – 4 December 1810 Tomás de Acosta y Hurtado de Mendoza (died 1821)
 4 December 1810 – 10 June 1819 Juan de Dios de Ayala y Gudiño (died 1819) (military governor from 3 July 1810)
 10 June 1819 – 11 October 1821 Juan Manuel de Cañas y Trujillo (interim)

Provinces under the Real Audiencia of Manila
 Spanish East Indies were under the judicial jurisdiction of the Real Audiencia of Manila and the administrative supervision of the Governor General-Captain General with great autonomy from the Viceroy of New Spain.
 See Governor-General of the Philippines for list.

Sources and references
 WorldStatesmen – see each present country
 Marquez Terrazas, Zacarias. Memorias del Papigochic. Liberia Kosmos. 2005

See also
 List of viceroys of New Spain
 Viceroyalty of New Spain

 02
Gubernatorial titles
History of New Spain
New Spain, governors
02